The U.S. Army Edgewood Chemical Biological Center (ECBC) is the United States's principal research and development resource for non-medical chemical and biological (CB) defense. As a critical national asset in the CB defense community, ECBC supports all phases of the acquisition life-cycle ― from basic and applied research through technology development, engineering design, equipment evaluation, product support, sustainment, field operations and demilitarization ― to address its customers’ unique requirements.

ECBC has full-time employees located at three different sites in the United States: Edgewood Area of Aberdeen Proving Ground (APG), Md., Pine Bluff, Arkansas, and Rock Island, Illinois. It is a research, development and engineering center (RDEC) under the U.S. Army Research, Development and Engineering Command (RDECOM).

In 2018, ECBC was reorganized under the new United States Army Futures Command to be part of the United States Army Combat Capabilities Development Command as the Chemical Biological Center (DEVCOM CBC).

History
ECBC's science and technology expertise has protected the United States from the threat of chemical weapons since 1917 when President Woodrow Wilson issued a proclamation that designated Gunpowder Neck, Maryland, as the site for the first chemical shell filling plant in the United States. Since that time, the center has expanded its mission to include biological materials and emerges today as the nation's premier authority on chemical and biological defense.

ECBC has a history of developing technologies in the areas of detection, protection and decontamination. The center's reputation and track record have produced invaluable relationships with other federal agencies and earned it a spot as a key organization within the Department of Defense’s (DoD) Chemical Biological Defense Program (CBDP), which manages national defense strategies and ensures that military operations are unconstrained by chemical, biological, radiological, nuclear and explosives (CBRNE) effects.

Critical core capabilities
1. CB Agent Spectroscopy/Algorithm Development: This capability includes critical research associated with detection of chemical and biological materials from a distance.

2. Inhalation Toxicology: Extensive scientific expertise, equipment and unique facilities to evaluate the toxicological impact of chemical agents and toxins on animals in highly controlled/instrumented conditions.

3. Aerosol Physics: Scientific knowledge equipment and facilities are used to apply aerosol physics concepts to the development of predictive models for in-depth understanding of bacteria and virus particles.

4. Filtration Sciences: Scientific capabilities and research are applied to determine more efficient methods to protect from toxic airborne respiratory hazards.

5. OPCW Laboratory: ECBC is designated under the Chemical Warfare Convention's (CWC) Organization for the Prohibition of Chemical Weapons (OPCW) as a designated laboratory to accurately and predictably identify chemical compounds prohibited by the CWC.

6. Emerging Threats Science/Technology & Testing: Critical expertise and facilities to safely research emerging toxic threats, including synthesis, toxicity, properties (chemical/physical), persistence, decontamination and environmental fate.

7. Single Small-Scale Facility: ECBC maintains the only declared facility under the CWC where chemical compounds regulated by the treaty can be produced for protective purposes.

8. CB Agent Handling and Surety: Expert level safety, industrial hygiene, security, surety and environmental protection professionals focused on maintaining ECBC's critical national core competency to safely handle the world's most toxic chemical and biological materials.

9. Chemical Munitions Field Operations: Field deployable scientists, engineers, technicians and explosives specialists with chemical/biological agent surety expertise provide this unique capability for remediation of CB agent materials and other sensitive materials.

10. Lifecycle CB Materiel Acquisition: ECBC drives technology transitions from research to engineering and development to production, fielding, and sustainment.

11. CB Concept Through Sustainment Solutions: Using recent technologies available throughout industry and the Government, ECBC can rapidly execute complex projects covering all interdisciplinary aspects of design, development and production to meet the diverse range of customer requirements across the CBRNE community.

12. Full-Service CB Testing: ECBC retains the expertise and cutting-edge infrastructure to test product performance in surety and non-surety environments.

13. Chemistry and Bioscience of CB Warfare: Provide basic scientific understanding of chemistry and bioscience aspects of chemicals, toxins and biological organisms that may have potential as biological or chemical warfare materials.

Major facilities

Advanced Chemistry Laboratory

The Advanced Chemistry Laboratory (ACL), a chemistry laboratory built in 2005, is a facility designed for working with the most toxic known compounds. Highly instrumented and adaptable, the ACL is designed for flexibility so that it can address the ever-changing requirements of scientific advancement. Safety in and outside the laboratory is a primary consideration. Primary facilities within the ACL include advanced toxic agent laboratories, environmental chambers, and secure work spaces for classified materials. Chemical agent operations in this building include analytical chemistry, Chemical Weapons Convention (CWC) treaty support, filtration, decontamination and evaluation of chemical agent detectors.

A central feature of the lab is a suite of Nuclear Magnetic Resonance (NMR) spectrometers. The NMR spectrometer suite, a critical tool that helps scientists identify the molecular structure of chemicals, provides support to researchers working in the fields of decontamination, carbon studies and sample analysis for the CWC treaty. In addition to supporting ECBC's Warfighter mission, the ACL allows the center to continue to serve the homeland security community as well as all federal agencies, including the intelligence community, Federal Bureau of Investigation, Department of Justice and the Department of State.

McNamara Life Sciences Building

The McNamara Life Sciences building, a general-purpose laboratory test building built in 1997, allows scientists to manage and execute the Department of Defense Science & Technology programs and monitor international efforts in Chemical Biological (CB) Defense and Smoke & Target Defeat while supporting the full-spectrum of vital U.S. CB Defense program efforts. The facility's original mission was to perform toxicology research. McNamara houses BSL 2/3 labs and has state-of-the-art equipment to safely conduct inhalation studies for chemical agents. The facility also allows scientists to conduct basic and applied research on non-medical countermeasures, pathogenicity studies, gene regulators and detection evaluation that rely upon moderate risk microorganisms to those causing serious and potential lethal infection up to and including BSL3.

Bio Engineering Laboratory

The Bio Engineering Laboratory (BeL), a chemistry and biology laboratory built in 1991 is the only full spectrum biotechnology capability within the Department of Defense (DoD). It is fully staffed for industrial-scale production of bio-molecules used in detection and decontamination systems fielded to the Warfighter and to civilian responders. The BeL is an engineering facility with fermentation ranging from 5L to 1500L, along with matching scale downstream protein separation, purification lyophilization and spray drying. The BeL also houses a biosurety-compliant, secure, state-of-the-art cold storage capability.

Forensic Analytical Center

The Forensic Analytical Center, a chemistry/biology laboratory built in 1993, allows scientists to analyze hundreds of relatively routine samples and conduct highly sophisticated chemical analysis on samples that may contain unusual materials and trace amounts of materials, including chemical and biological warfare agents for which results may be expected within hours or days.

The lab and its specialized equipment are independently accredited by international organizations to ISO 9001 and ISO Guide 25/17025. Primary facilities in the Forensic Analytical Center include gas chromatographs, Fourier transform spectroscopy, mass spectrometry, ion chromatograph, capillary zone electrophoresis, nuclear magnetic resonance and bio identification.

Engineering & test facilities

Toxic Test Chambers were built 1943. Another facility was built 1971. Both hazardous material test facilities have  chambers, equipped with 5000 CFM CBR filter systems with an air change approximately every three minutes maintaining the chambers under negative pressure, uniquely designed for total containment in the testing of chemical (military and industrial) related equipment, and explosive/toxic munitions/materials. Chemical warfare agents and explosives may be tested simultaneously. An onsite surety lab is equipped with GC/MS, HPLC, Dynatherm, and wet lab capabilities to perform agent analysis to RDTE drinking standards.

Prototype Detonation Test and Destruction Facility

The Prototype Detonation Test and Destruction Facility (PDTDF) is capable of testing technologies that require various site layouts. The facility is located at J-Field in the Edgewood Area of Aberdeen Proving Ground, Md. The PDTDF can accommodate the heaviest of the transportable systems that are currently in use.

Some previous systems that have been tested include Large Item Transportable Access and Neutralization System (LITANS), Explosive Destruction System (EDS), and the Transportable Detonation Chamber (TDC).

The environmentally controlled chamber is monitored by an onsite monitoring room and has the capability of providing supplied air and decontamination services. Personal protective equipment storage and changing rooms are connected to the chamber to allow ease of egress and ingress. The PDTDF permits have been approved for up to 1 pound TNT-equivalent. However, current destructions systems located at the site have been approved for 62.5 pounds TNT-equivalent explosives.

Berger Engineering Complex

The Berger Lab Complex, built in 1989, is a multi-purpose building with professional offices, 100-seat auditorium, general purpose labs, and high bay test areas for handling combat vehicles. Berger's laboratories help to develop defensive equipment used by Warfighters under nuclear, biological and chemical attack and to conduct biological research.

The complex includes a  Test Bay Area, which is composed of five test bays that are two stories high. The bays are specifically designed so that a typical combat vehicle can be driven into them for any functional testing. They are also equipped with movable and detachable engine exhaust hoses and rooftop ventilators. The high bay area serves as a production line area with space for up to 10 High Mobility Multipurpose Wheeled Vehicles (HMMWVs) at one time.

Computer Aided Design, experimental fabrication, and the electronics lab can be accessed from this area. This facility allows items to be assembled, tested and delivered from a single location.

Recent facilities construction

Standoff Detection Technology Evaluation Facility

The Standoff Detection Technology Evaluation facility allows researchers to release a known amount of material while maintaining a calibrated material scatter so that a standoff detector's ability to “see” can be accurately measured from up to several kilometers away. This increased precision reduces uncertainty about the potential field performance of standoff detectors.

The Standoff Detection Technology Evaluation Facility was designed for use in the Artemis Chemical Standoff Detection Program to allow aerosol backscatter and vapor measurements with a frequency-agile carbon dioxide (CO2) Light Detection and Ranging (LIDAR) standoff detector. The chamber utilizes curtains of air produced by an interior vortex and balanced by an exterior counter flow of air to contain the material cloud. This also prevents the backscatter off of conventional hard windows from corrupting the desired measurements on the cloud inside the chamber. The prevention of backscatter is critical because the CO2 LIDAR has a long (1 microsecond) pulse and the backscatter off the window cannot be temporally separated from the backscatter off of an aerosol in the chamber.

With modifications, this ECBC asset can be used with all passive and active, chemical and biological standoff technologies and systems at any stage of development. The chamber was designed for testing with a variety of CB simulants, interferents and selected toxic industrial chemicals in both vapor and aerosol form. ECBC is exploring the regulatory acceptability of extending the operations to include “kill” pathogens, which would produce a tremendous benefit for the CBDP if permitted. Using ground truth instrumentation, the Standoff Detection Technology Evaluation Facility has been shown to successfully contain a homogeneous aerosol cloud.

Sample Receipt Facility (SRF)

The Sample Receipt Facility, is the first full-range, interagency resource, funded by the U.S. Army, the FBI and the Department of Homeland Security, to receive, triage, sample and screen “unknowns” with the potential of chemical, biological, radiological or explosive configurations.

Chemical Transfer (single small-scale) Facility

The Chemical Transfer Facility (CTF), built in 1983, is the only U.S. single small-scale facility, a single repository for the Army's research and development stock of toxic chemical agents. The CTF is a Category II Security/Storage Facility, which houses bulk storage of chemical agents in accessible containers intended for withdrawal and issue to support research, development, testing and/or training operations. The CTF is the only location within the U.S. where chemical compounds defined by the Chemical Weapons Convention (CWC) can be produced in amounts greater than 100 ml per year.

References

Sources

External links
Edgewood Chemical Biological Center (Official Page)
Official Facebook Page
Official Twitter Page
Official YouTube Page

Chemical warfare facilities
Biological warfare facilities
United States biological weapons program